Mozhaysky District is the name of several administrative and municipal districts in Russia:
Mozhaysky District, Moscow, a district in Western Administrative Okrug of the federal city of Moscow
Mozhaysky District, Moscow Oblast, an administrative and municipal district of Moscow Oblast

See also
Mozhaysky (disambiguation)

References